RING finger protein 10 is a protein that in humans is encoded by the RNF10 gene.

Function 

The protein encoded by this gene contains a ring finger motif, which is known to be involved in protein-protein interactions. The specific function of this protein has not yet been determined. EST data suggests the existence of multiple alternatively spliced transcript variants, however, their full length nature is not known.

Model organisms				

Model organisms have been used in the study of RNF10 function. A conditional knockout mouse line, called Rnf10tm1a(KOMP)Wtsi was generated as part of the International Knockout Mouse Consortium program — a high-throughput mutagenesis project to generate and distribute animal models of disease to interested scientists.

Male and female animals underwent a standardized phenotypic screen to determine the effects of deletion. Twenty two tests were carried out on mutant mice and five significant abnormalities were observed. Homozygous mutant animals displayed increased chromosomal stability in a micronucleus test. Females also had increased body weight,  an increased amount of total body fat and an abnormal complete blood count. Males additionally displayed an increase in eating behavior.

References

Further reading 

 
 
 
 
 
 

Genes mutated in mice
RING finger proteins